Gintarė Vostrecovaitė (born 6 May 1986 in Kaunas) is a Lithuanian figure skater. She is a five time (2001–2005) Lithuanian national champion. She competed at twelve ISU Championships, eight of them at the senior level. Her highest placement at a senior event was 24th at the 2004 European Figure Skating Championships and her highest placement at a junior event was 24th at the 2003 World Junior Figure Skating Championships.

References

External links
 Tracings.net profile

Lithuanian female single skaters
1986 births
Living people
Sportspeople from Kaunas